Khairul Hamed is the 10th Commander of the Royal Brunei Land Forces (RBLF) from 2018 to 2020.

Education 
Throughout his career, he attended several institutes and training overseas; graduated from Officer Cadet School, Waiouru, New Zealand on 19 June 1991, the Jungle Warfare Long Range Patrol Course with Training Team Brunei in Seria, Belait in 1991, the Platoon Commander Course at PULADA, Malaysia in 1992, the Staff Duty Course in Port Dickson, Malaysia in 1997, the Advanced Infantry Officer Course and Company Tactic Course in Singapore in 2000, the Army Advance Tactics Course in Malaysia in 2001, the Advanced Military Technology in Singapore in 2004 and Singapore Command and Staff College in 2005. Graduate of Malaysian Armed Forces Defence College with Master of Social Science (MSSc) in Defence Studies, awarded at The National University of Malaysia in 2014.

Military career
On 5 February 1990, he underwent military recruit training and would come back from New Zealand, as an officer cadet that following year. He would then become an Infantry Platoon Commander and Commanding Officer (CO) of with Second Battalion RBLF. After that, he was posted as an Intake Commander at Recruit Company and later, Chief instructors at Training Center Royal Brunei Armed Forces (present day Training Institute RBAF). The handover ceremony between Abidin Abdul Hamid an Khairul Hamed was held at Penanjong Garrison on 29 July 2016.

Other than being an instructor, he was an Adjutant of Third Battalion RBLF and Chief of Staff, Joint Force Head Quarters (COS JFHQ), later promoted to Colonel in 2015 and became the COS RBLF. Due to his expertise and experiences in the military, Colonel Khairul Hamed was appointed as the 10th Commander of the RBLF. The appointment was made upon the consent of Sultan Hassanal Bolkiah, and the handover ceremony between Khairul Hamed and Aminan Mahmud was held at Bolkiah Garrison, Bandar Seri Begawan on 31 January 2018. Two days later on 2 February, he would be promoted to the rank of Brigadier General.

The 20 April 2018, the handover ceremony of the newly acquired KH-27 patrol boats was attended both Commander Aminan Mahmud and Khairul Hamed. Brigadier General Khairul Hamed signed a Terms of Reference (TOR) with then Commander of the Philippine Army, Lieutenant General Macairog S. Alberto at Fort Bonifacio, Metro Manila on 13 November 2019. The signing aims to expand the two nation's bilateral cooperation and establish a stronger regional security. On 30 July 2020, the handover ceremony between Khairul Hamed and the next commander, Muhammad Haszaimi, was held at Berakas Garrison.

Personal life
Khairul Hamed is married to Mazlin binti Osman and has six children together. In addition, he enjoys golfing and traveling.

Honours

National 

  Order of Pahlawan Negara Brunei First Class (PSPNB) – Dato Seri Pahlawan (15 July 2018)
  Order of Setia Negara Brunei Fourth Class (PSB) – (2012)
  Golden Jubilee Medal – (5 October 2017)
  Silver Jubilee Medal – (5 October 1992)
  General Service Medal (Armed Forces)
  Royal Brunei Armed Forces Golden Jubilee Medal – (31 May 2011)

Foreign 

 :
  Pingat Jasa Gemilang – (4 December 2019)

References

Living people
Bruneian military leaders
Year of birth missing (living people)